Ginzel is a lunar impact crater that is located on the far side of the Moon, just beyond the eastern limb. It is named after the Austrian astronomer Friedrich Karl Ginzel. It lies at the eastern edge of the Mare Marginis, in a region of the surface that is sometimes brought into sight of the Earth due to libration. To the north-northeast of Ginzel is the crater Popov, and Dreyer lies due south.

Much of the rim and interior of Ginzel have been flooded, leaving only a faint trace of the rim in the otherwise relatively level surface. The western rim projects more prominently above the surrounding irregular plain. The flooded satellite crater Ginzel L is attached to the southern part of the rim, and a small craterlet lies across the rim to the north. Within the interior is a pair of joined small craterlets in the western half. The interior is otherwise nearly featureless.

Satellite craters
By convention these features are identified on lunar maps by placing the letter on the side of the crater midpoint that is closest to Ginzel.

References

 
 
 
 
 
 
 
 
 
 
 

Impact craters on the Moon